This is a list of two-tier counties of England by population.

It includes those non-metropolitan counties (also known as shire counties) with a two-tier county council structure and does not include metropolitan counties or unitary authorities.

Where a unitary authority has separated from a shire county the population of the unitary authority is counted elsewhere. For example, the population of York is not included in North Yorkshire in this table.

Densities are calculated from population and area values.

References

non-metropolitan counties of England by population
non-metropolitan counties of England by population
 Population
non-metropolitan counties of England by population